"Welcome to My Truth" is a song by American recording artist Anastacia from her third studio album, Anastacia. Written by Anastacia, Kara DioGuardi, and John Shanks and released as the album's third single in Europe on November 8, 2004, the song chronicles Anastacia's strained relationship with her father, who left her at a young age, along with the singer's battle with breast cancer. While "Welcome to My Truth" failed to match overall the success of its predecessors, "Left Outside Alone" and "Sick and Tired", it fared relatively well in certain European nations, such as Italy, the Netherlands, and Spain.

Critical reception
Andy Gill of The Independent wrote that this song is connected to Anastacia's battle with cancer :"It's more likely to be the trigger behind the anthemic positivism of 'Welcome to My Truth.'"

Music video
Directed by Diane Martel, the video was filmed in the Napa County, California, on July 17–18, 2004.

In the music video, a young girl is seen watching her parents having a fight, while clips are shown of Anastacia in a garden singing that "she has hit about a million walls". The father – played by actor Wade Williams – reluctantly leaves the house and waves goodbye to the little girl. At the second verse, the little girl is shown playing with toys and watching TV with her brother and mother. When the chorus reprises, the girl is at school painting a portrait of Mona Lisa, for which she is given a medal. When she gets home, she sticks the number-one prize to the refrigerator so that her mother could see it and be proud of her. The mother, however, does not take notice of her prize and walks by it, which obviously disappoints the child; it also reveals the sadness of her mother, distracted by grief.

Next, the child is shown painting a happy painting at nighttime. Anastacia is then seen hugging the girl in a garden, and as Anastacia's past and present collide we can see she is overcoming her pain. The painting the child creates represents that even though her life is not as perfect as she wants it to be, she can still be happy.

Track listings

UK CD1
 "Welcome to My Truth"
 "Left Outside Alone" (Jason Nevins mix show edit)

UK CD2
 "Welcome to My Truth"
 "The Saddest Part"
 "Left Outside Alone" (Jason Nevins global club edit)
 "Welcome to My Truth" (live version)
 "Welcome to My Truth" (video)

European CD single
 "Welcome to My Truth" – 4:03
 "The Saddest Part" – 4:10

European enhanced CD single
 "Welcome to My Truth" – 4:03
 "The Saddest Part" – 4:10
 "Sick and Tired" (live from The Hospital) – 3:59
 "Welcome to My Truth" (Video)

Australian CD single
 "Welcome to My Truth"
 "The Saddest Part"
 "Sick and Tired" (live from The Hospital)

Credits and personnel
Credits are taken from the European CD single liner notes and the Anastacia album booklet.

Studios
 Recorded at Henson Recording Studios (Hollywood, California)
 Mixed at South Beach Studios (Miami Beach, Florida)
 Mastered at Sterling Sound (New York City)

Personnel

 Anastacia – writing, vocals, executive production
 Kara DioGuardi – writing, background vocals
 John Shanks – writing, guitars, keyboards, production
 Paul Bushnell – bass
 Kenny Aronoff – drums
 Jeff Rothschild – recording
 Thomas R. Yezzi – recording (vocals)
 Mark Valentine – additional recording
 Shari Sutcliffe – musician contracting
 Tom Lord-Alge – mixing
 Femio Hernandez – second mix engineer
 Lisa Braudé – executive production
 Ted Jensen – mastering

Charts

Weekly charts

Year-end charts

Release history

References

2004 singles
2004 songs
Anastacia songs
Daylight Records singles
Epic Records singles
Music videos directed by Diane Martel
Song recordings produced by John Shanks
Songs written by Anastacia
Songs written by John Shanks
Songs written by Kara DioGuardi